Stanford Training Area (STANTA), originally known as Stanford Battle Area, is a British Army training area situated in the English county of Norfolk. The site is run by the Mission Ready Training Centre (MRTC).

History
The area was originally established in 1942 when a battle training area was required and a 'Nazi village' established. Military exercises were already known in the area; tanks had deployed to Thetford in the First World War. The complete takeover involved the evacuation of the villages of Buckenham Tofts, Langford, Stanford, Sturston, Tottington and West Tofts.

The area was used during the run-up to the D-Day invasion and since then has hosted many exercises.  In 2009 a  village designed to replicate its Afghan equivalent was added to the Battle Area for the training of troops deployed in support of the War in Afghanistan. The site, built at a cost of £14 million, is state of the art and populated by Afghan nationals, ex-Gurkha soldiers and amputee actors, who simulate the Afghan National Army, locals and wounded soldiers. The village includes houses, a market and a mosque. It also features a system that pumps out smells like rotten meat and sewage.

The facilities
The battle area includes four historic churches; the one at West Tofts was restored by Pugin and a new "church" forms part of the specially constructed village of Eastmere. Eastmere was originally built to give soldiers experience of fighting on the northern European plains.  There is a short landing strip at 

As a live firing area, access is not allowed without special permission from the Army. In the main this is limited to a number of tours a year and compassionate grounds for former residents of the villages or their relatives.

The area forms part of the distinctive Breckland landscape region, a gorse-covered sandy heath which offers poor agricultural opportunities. Arguably, its use as a military training area has safeguarded a substantial archaeological landscape. Like many other military or restricted access areas in the UK such as Bovington Camp, the buffer area around Porton Down, and MOD areas on Salisbury Plain, it is the home of a wealth of rare species of flora and fauna already lost in other parts of the country. Parts of the training area are designated Site of Special Scientific Interest (SSSI).

The battle area was used in the filming of many of the episodes of the comedy series Dad's Army.

References

Sources
  Ordnance Survey (1999). OS Explorer Map 229 - Thetford in the Brecks. .
  NorfolkChurches.co.uk. "Norfolk battle training area churches". Retrieved February 17, 2006.
 Telegraph. An Afghan village has been built by the Ministry of Defence in Thetford, Norfolk. Retrieved May 12, 2009.

External links
 See also BBC WW2 Peoples War site Breckland Exodus-The Forced Evacuation of the Norfolk Battle Area 1942 Part 1
 See also BBC WW2 Peoples War site Breckland Exodus-The Forced Evacuation of the Norfolk Battle Area 1942 Part 2 by Conal O'Donnell
 Violets for Vera-the death of West Tofts School 1942 by Conal O'Donnell
 Touring the Stanta ghost villages
 Google Earth view

Training establishments of the British Army
Geography of Norfolk
Military in Norfolk
Sites of Special Scientific Interest in Norfolk
Military training areas in the United Kingdom